Rajadurgada Rahasya is a 1967 Indian Kannada-language film, jointly directed by A. C. Narasimha Murthy and S.K.Bhagwan and produced by A. Vasudeva Rao and T. Dwarakanath. The film stars Rajkumar, Bharathi, Udaykumar, Narasimharaju and Dinesh. The film has musical score by G. K. Venkatesh. Rajkumar plays dual roles in the movie. S.K.Bhagwan had revealed that though he was the actual director of the movie, the credits were jointly given to him and Narasimha Murthy who was the chief financier of the movie. The movie was dubbed in Tamil as Malaikotai Marmam.

Cast

Rajkumar
Udaykumar
Narasimharaju
Dinesh
Kashinath
Ganapathi Bhat
Rajan
Swamy
Bangalore Nagesh
Bharathi
Papamma
Jyothi
B. V. Radha
Suryakumari
Lakshmi

Soundtrack
The music was composed by G. K. Venkatesh.

References

External links
 

1967 films
1960s Kannada-language films
Films scored by G. K. Venkatesh